Inger Stender (1912–1989) was a Danish actress of stage, film and television whose sophisticated elegance and classic beauty earned her the description of Denmark's version of Marlene Dietrich.

Early life
Inger Margueritha Stender was born 7 June 1912 in Copenhagen, Denmark, the daughter of a baker. She attended drama classes from 1929 to 1931 at the student schools for the Komediehuset (Comedy House) and Det Ny Teater (The New Theater), then made her stage debut at Det Ny Teater on 24 April 1931 in the role of Flora in C.E. Soya's Kendt Navne.

Career

Theater
Beginning in the 1930s, Stender was an actress for several stage companies throughout Denmark, including the Riddersalen, Odense Theater, Apollo Theater, Aalborg Theater and Aarhus Theater. She was a prolific and versatile stage actress, playing roles in Uncle Tom's Cabin, Tartuffe, and Henry IV as well as cabarets and comedies. In one season alone at the Odense Theater (1934–1935), Stender played 14 leading roles and received critical success as The Ship's Boy in Alle Mand på Dæk (All Hands on Deck). Stender also became an operetta star when she sang the title role in Den Skønne Helene (The Beautiful Helena) and was Zorina in Zorina.

Film
Stender made her film debut in 1931 as the daughter Rosa in Hotel Paradis. The following year, at the age of 20, Stender played her first leading role as the sweet heroine in the Liva Weel farce Odds 777. Throughout the 1930s and the early 1940s, she continued to be cast as the charming young girl in such films as Benjamin Christensen's Barnet and the Herman Bang story, Sommerglæder. It was in her next film that Stender finally caught the type of role for which she would become known—the 1943 Marguerite Viby comedy Som du vil ha' mig -! (However You Would Have Me-!), in which she played the sophisticated, and a little too intimate society girl.

Danish film historian Morten Piil described Stender's onscreen persona as blonde, beautiful and sophisticated with an almost aristocratic elegance yet a "mischievous twinkle" in her eyes. He refers to her as the Danish version of Marlene Dietrich. Stender continued to reprise this persona as the opera singer in Så mødes vi hos Tove, the rash society dame in Foldboldpræsten and the threatening woman in Fra den gamle købmandsgård (1951). However, Stender said that her desire was to play a light comedy part like the lead in the Noël Coward operetta Bitter Sweet, but that newspaper reviews focused so much on her beauty that it perhaps prevented her from receiving more varied roles. 

Stender performed in film and television in the 1970s, but in smaller roles of matronly or maternal characters. She made 38 films over a span of six decades, with her final role in 1981 in the Danish television series Matador.

Personal life 
Stender married Mogens Flindt-Larsen in 1935 and they had two sons together. They divorced in 1940. Stender maintained a longterm romantic relationship with the Danish actor Poul Reichhardt with whom she appeared in the 1941 film Moster fra Mols. Stender died on 26 June 1989 at the age of 77 and is buried in Søndermark Kirkegård in Frederiksborg Denmark.

Filmography 

Hotel Paradis - 1931
Odds 777 - 1932
Lynet - 1934
Der var engang en vicevært - 1937
Mille, Marie og mig - 1937
Komtessen på Stenholt - 1939
Jeg har elsket og levet - 1940
Sommerglæder - 1940
En pige med pep - 1940
Barnet - 1940
En mand af betydning - 1941
Thummelumsen - 1941
Natekspressen (P. 903) - 1942
En pige uden lige - 1943
Som du vil ha' mig - 1943
Moster fra Mols - 1943
Alt for karrieren - 1943
Så mødes vi hos Tove - 1946
Fodboldpræsten - 1951
Fra den gamle købmandsgård - 1951
Jan går til filmen - 1954
Ung kærlighed - 1958
Peters baby - 1961
Cirkus Buster - 1961
Kampen om Næsbygaard - 1964
Mord for åbent tæppe - 1964
Don Olsen kommer til byen - 1964
Næsbygaards arving - 1965
Krybskytterne på Næsbygaard - 1966
Midt i en jazztid - 1969
Christa - 1970
Farlige kys - 1972
I din fars lomme - 1973
Strømer - 1976
Terror - 1977
Slægten - 1978
Næste stop - Paradis - 1980
Sådan er jeg osse - 1980

References

External links
 
Inger Stender at The Danish Film Database (In Danish)
Inger Stender at The Danish Film Institute (In Danish)

Danish television actresses
Danish film actresses
Danish stage actresses
1912 births
1989 deaths
Actresses from Copenhagen
20th-century Danish actresses